Pape Habib Sow (born December 2, 1985 in Dakar) is a Senegalese former footballer who played as a defensive midfielder.

Career
After making an impact as a defensive midfielder to Portugal with Académica, Pape attracted attention from many clubs and most notably from the Greek giants Panathinaikos FC leading to the signing of a 3 year-deal contract with the Greens, which will keep him to the club until 2015. He scored his first goal for his new club in a Greek Cup match against Proodeftiki and his first League goal in a derby against AEK Athens. After leaving Rio Ave, he signed for Veikkausliiga side Inter.

Honours
Académica
Portuguese Cup: 2011–12

References

External links
 
 
 
 

1985 births
Living people
Footballers from Dakar
Senegalese footballers
Senegalese expatriate footballers
Expatriate footballers in Portugal
Expatriate footballers in Greece
Expatriate footballers in Turkey
Primeira Liga players
Super League Greece players
Süper Lig players
RC Strasbourg Alsace players
FC Sochaux-Montbéliard players
Entente SSG players
LB Châteauroux players
U.D. Leiria players
Associação Académica de Coimbra – O.A.F. players
Panathinaikos F.C. players
Elazığspor footballers
Association football midfielders